Renée Sylvaire is a French film actress of the silent era.

Selected filmography 
 The System of Doctor Goudron (1913)
 The Red Promenade (1914)
 The Secret of the Well (1914)
 The Sparrow (1914)
 Koenigsmark (1923)

References

Bibliography 
 Waldman, Harry. Maurice Tourneur: The Life and Films. McFarland, 2001.

External links 

1892 births
1971 deaths
French film actresses
French silent film actresses
20th-century French actresses